Pierre Kalfon is a French film producer and director.

Selected filmography
Director
 OSS 117 prend des vacances (1970)
 La Cravache – The Whip (1972)

Producer
 A Taste for Women (1964)
 Cinq gars pour Singapour (1967)
 Adelaide (1968)
 The Boldest Job in the West (1969)
 The Palace of Angels (1970)

References

External links
 

French film directors
French film producers
Living people
Year of birth missing (living people)